is a Japanese backstroke swimmer.

Major achievements
2009 Junior Pan Pacific Swimming Championships
 100m backstroke 1st (1:01.13)
 200m backstroke 2nd (2:12.00)

Personal bests
In long course
 50m backstroke: 27.88 (July 29, 2009)
 100m backstroke: 59.14 Asian Japanese Record (July 28, 2009)
 200m backstroke: 2:09.06 (August 28, 2008)

In short course
 50m backstroke: 26.42 (February 21, 2009)
 100m backstroke: 55.23 World record (November 15, 2009)
 200m backstroke: 2:00.18 Former world record (November 14, 2009)

See also
 World record progression 100 metres backstroke
 World record progression 200 metres backstroke

References

1990 births
Living people
Japanese female backstroke swimmers
People from Koga, Fukuoka
Sportspeople from Fukuoka Prefecture
World record setters in swimming
Asian Games medalists in swimming
Swimmers at the 2010 Asian Games
Swimmers at the 2014 Asian Games
Universiade medalists in swimming
Asian Games gold medalists for Japan
Asian Games silver medalists for Japan
Medalists at the 2010 Asian Games
Medalists at the 2014 Asian Games
Universiade gold medalists for Japan
Universiade bronze medalists for Japan
Medalists at the 2009 Summer Universiade
Medalists at the 2011 Summer Universiade
20th-century Japanese women
21st-century Japanese women